The 2007 BWF Grand Prix Gold and Grand Prix was the inaugural season of BWF Grand Prix Gold and Grand Prix under the new tournament structure introduced by Badminton World Federation (BWF). It was held from February 28 and will end on December 12, 2007. 12 events were planned, but India Open Grand Prix Gold was cancelled following the bomb blast in the city. The organizers decided to postpone the tournament to indefinite date. However, the President of Badminton Association of India said the tournament is likely to take place from January 7 to January 13, 2008. But BWF later confirmed the event was cancelled. Had the tournament been held, it would have been held in Kotla Vijay Bhaskar Reddy Indoor Stadium, Hyderabad from 4–9 September 2007.

Schedule 
Below is the schedule released by Badminton World Federation:

Results

Winners

Performance by countries 
Tabulated below are the Grand Prix performances based on countries. Only countries who have won a title are listed:

Grand Prix Gold 
Thailand Open
July 3—July 8, Nimibutr Stadium, Bangkok, Thailand.

Philippines Open
July 17—22, PhilSports Arena, Pasig, Philippines.

Chinese Taipei Open
September 18—September 23, Taipei County Shinjuang Stadium, Hsinchuang City, Taipei, Taiwan.

Macau Open
October 2—October 7, Macau Polytechnic Institute Multisport Pavilion, Macau.

Russian Open
December 5—December 9, CSKA Universal Sports Hall, Moscow, Russia.

Grand Prix
German Open
February 27—March 4, RWE Rhein-Ruhr Sporthalle, Mülheim, Germany.

New Zealand Open
May 15—May 20, Auckland Badminton Hall, Auckland, New Zealand.

U.S. Open
August 27—September 1, Orange County Badminton Club, Orange, California, United States.

Bitburger Open
October 2—October 7, Saarlandhalle, Saarbrücken, Germany.

Dutch Open
October 16—October 21, Topsportcentrum Almere, Almere, Netherlands.

Vietnam Open
November 6—November 11, Quan Ngua Sports Palace, Hanoi, Vietnam.

References

BWF Grand Prix Gold and Grand Prix
BWF Grand Prix Gold and Grand Prix